Typhoon Xangsane, known in the Philippines as Typhoon Reming, was a typhoon that made landfall in the Philippines and Taiwan. The 30th named storm and 12th typhoon of the 2000 Pacific typhoon season. Xangsane made landfall in southern Luzon in the Philippines, on October 27. And then turned north - northeastward over the South China Sea. The storm paralleled the eastern coast of Taiwan, the next day. After leaving the vicinity of Taiwan, Xangsane started to weaken as it continued to move northeastward over the East China Sea and subsequently transitioned to an extratropical cyclone, midway between the eastern coast of China and the northern Okinawa Islands, on November 1. Xangsane was responsible for 187 casualties, including 83 possible indirect from the crash of Singapore Airlines Flight 006 on October 31, 2000.

Meteorological history 

On October 24, the formation of a tropical cyclone began in the waters near Palau, and on October 25, the Joint Typhoon Warning Center (JTWC), designated it 30W. The tropical cyclone then reached the surveillance area of the Philippines, so it was given the Philippine name "Reming" by PAGASA. After that, 30W (Reming) was named "Xangsane". This name was proposed by Laos and means "Elephant". Xangsane made landfall in Luzon, Philippines, on October 27. After leaving the Philippines, it proceeded northward and than northeastward over the South China Sea, on October 29. Before brushing past Taiwan to its east, with Taiwan getting a direct hit by the western eyewall. On November 1, Xangsane started to weaken, as it continued to move northeastward before transitioning into an extratropical cyclone in the East China Sea, at 12:00 (UTC), the same day.

Xangsane was the 15th storm that approached Japan in 2000. 2000 was a rare year when the number of storms approached Japan was relatively high, even though there were no storms that made landfall in Japan.

Impact 
Xangsane brought impacts to the Manila metropolitan area. Strong winds and heavy rains occurred in Quezon, Bulacan, Zambales and Pangasinan, as well as in the Bicol region of southern Luzon. In Tayabas, Quezon, rainfall amount of 312.3 mm was observed in 24 hours. The storm killed 40 people, lost 100,000 homes, and caused damage of $27.45 million. In Taiwan, the storm killed 64 and injured 65 people, and 25 were declared missing and caused $500 million in damages.

Singapore Airlines Flight 006
On October 31, when Xangsane was approaching Taiwan, an accident of Singapore Airlines Flight 006 occurred at Zhongzheng International Airport (now Taiwan Taoyuan International Airport). Initially, it was suspected that the accident was due to the effect of Xangsane, but it was later discovered that the accident was due to a pilot error. However, some argue that this pilot error was due to poor visibility from Xangsane.

References

External links 
 

Typhoons in the Philippines
2000 in the Philippines
2000 Pacific typhoon season
Typhoons in Taiwan
2000 in Taiwan